Turtle Man may refer to:

Ernie Lee Brown, Jr., nicknamed "The Turtle Man", whose exploits are the subject of the Animal Planet series Call of the Wildman
Turtle (comics), two villains who appear in comic books published by DC Comics as enemies of the Flash, the second one also called Turtle Man